Stephania reticulata is a shrub native to Thailand, Malaysia and Indonesia described by Lewis Leonard Forman.

References

Flora of Asia
reticulata